Events in the year 1933 in Brazil.

Incumbents

Federal government 
 President: Getúlio Vargas (Head of the Provisional Government)
 Vice President: none

Governors 
 Alagoas: Louis de France Albuquerque (till 10 January); Alfonso de Carvalho (from 10 January)
 Amazonas: Álvaro Botelho Maia (till 10 October); Nélson de Melo (from 10 October)
 Bahia: Juracy Magalhães
 Ceará: Roberto Carneiro de Mendonça
 Goiás: 
 till 31 July: Pedro Ludovico Teixeira
 31 July - 8 September: José Carvalho dos Santos Azevedo
 from 8 September: Pedro Ludovico Teixeira
 Maranhão:
 till 10 February: Lourival Seroa da Mota
 10 February - 30 April: Américo Wanick
 30 April - 29 June: Álvaro Saldanha
 from 29 June: Antônio Martins de Almeida
 Mato Grosso: Leônidas Antero de Matos
 Minas Gerais: 
 till 5 September: Olegário Maciel
 5 September - 15 December: Gustavo Capanema
 from 15 December: Benedito Valadares
 Pará: Joaquim de Magalhães Barata
 Paraíba: Gratuliano da Costa Brito
 Paraná: Manuel Ribas
 Pernambuco: Carlos de Lima Cavalcanti
 Piauí: Landry Sales
 Rio Grande do Norte: 
 till 2 August: Bertino Dutra da Silva
 from 2 August: Mario Leopoldo Pereira da Camera
 Rio Grande do Sul: José Antônio Flores da Cunha
 Santa Catarina:
 São Paulo: 
 Sergipe:

Vice governors 
 Rio Grande do Norte:
 São Paulo:

Events 
19 April – Octávio Barbosa marries Beatriz de Lima Viana, at Belo Horizonte.
1 June –  The Federal University of São Paulo is founded in São Paulo, Brazil.
20 July – New airline Aerolloyd Iguassu goes into operation, with flights between Curitiba and São Paulo.
10 October – The Anti-war Treaty of Non-aggression and Conciliation, an inter-American treaty, is signed in Rio de Janeiro by representatives of Argentina, Brazil, Chile, Mexico, Paraguay and Uruguay.

Arts and culture

Books
Peter Fleming – Brazilian Adventure
Gilberto Freyre – Casa-Grande e Senzala

Films
A Voz do Carnaval 
Ganga Bruta
Honra e Ciúmes
Onde a Terra Acaba

Births 
7 January - Nicette Bruno, actress (died 2020)
9 January – Paulo Goulart, actor (died 2014)
27 January – Ary Fontoura, actor, writer, director, poet and TV-presenter
14 March – Manoel Carlos, novelist
8 July – Paulo Tarso Flecha de Lima, diplomat (died 2021)
28 October – Garrincha, footballer {died 1983)
5 November – Paulo César Saraceni, film director and screenwriter (died 2012)
14 December – Eva Wilma, actress (died 2021)

Deaths 
25 March – João de Deus Mena Barreto, a member of the junta that temporarily governed Brazil when Washington Luís was deposed.
19 April – Vital Soares, lawyer and politician (born 1874)
2 May – Juliano Moreira, psychiatrist (born 1872)
23 October – Jerônimo de Sousa Monteiro, politician (born 1870)

References

See also 
1933 in Brazilian football
List of Brazilian films of 1933

 
1930s in Brazil
Years of the 20th century in Brazil
Brazil
Brazil